Hélène Mignon (born 26 June 1934) is a French politician, representing Haute-Garonne's 6th constituency from 1988 to 1993 and
again from 1997 to 2007, as a member of the Socialist Party.

References

1934 births
Living people
20th-century French women politicians
Socialist Party (France) politicians
Chevaliers of the Légion d'honneur
Politicians from Toulouse